Halyal is a village in Belgaum district in the southern state of Karnataka, India.

Halyal's Pin code is 591304. The postal head office is located at 15.4589° N, 75.0078° E Athani.

Nearby villages include Nadi Ingalagaon (3 km), Hulagabali (4 km), Sankonatti (6 km), Naganur P K (7 km), Saptasagar (9 km). Halyal is surrounded by Raybag Taluk and Jamkhandi Taluk. Athani Terdal, Rabkavi Banhatti, Mahalingpur, and Mudalgiare are nearby cities.

Population

The population of Halyal is 4,525 (2,381 men and 2,144 women and 790 houses).

References

Villages in Belagavi district